Mount Kudlich is an  mountain summit located in the Alaska Range, in Denali National Park and Preserve, in Alaska, United States. Mount Kudlich is also referred to as Peak 11,300. The mountain was possibly named by explorer Belmore Browne for Herman C. Kudlich (1861-1946), City Magistrate of New York and member of the American Museum of Natural History. Belmore Browne participated in Frederick Cook's 1906 expedition which claimed the first ascent of Mount McKinley, but was later disproved.

Further reading
Joe Puryear's Alaska Climbing, (2006)

References

External links
 NOAA weather: Talkeetna
 Localized weather: Mountain Forecast
 YouTube: Avalanche on Kudlich

Alaska Range
Mountains of Matanuska-Susitna Borough, Alaska
Mountains of Denali National Park and Preserve
Mountains of Alaska